Patricia Valle Benítez (born 7 February 1979) is a Mexican Paralympic swimmer and councillor of Corregidora Municipality. She is a multiple medalist in both Summer Paralympics, World Para Swimming Championships and Parapan American Games.

References

1969 births
Living people
People from Querétaro
Paralympic swimmers of Mexico
Mexican female breaststroke swimmers
Mexican female butterfly swimmers
Mexican female freestyle swimmers
Mexican female medley swimmers
Swimmers at the 1996 Summer Paralympics
Swimmers at the 2000 Summer Paralympics
Swimmers at the 2004 Summer Paralympics
Swimmers at the 2008 Summer Paralympics
Swimmers at the 2012 Summer Paralympics
Swimmers at the 2016 Summer Paralympics
Medalists at the 2000 Summer Paralympics
Medalists at the 2004 Summer Paralympics
Medalists at the 2008 Summer Paralympics
Medalists at the 2012 Summer Paralympics
Medalists at the 2016 Summer Paralympics
Paralympic medalists in swimming
Paralympic gold medalists for Mexico
Paralympic silver medalists for Mexico
Paralympic bronze medalists for Mexico
Medalists at the 2011 Parapan American Games
Medalists at the 2015 Parapan American Games
Medalists at the 2019 Parapan American Games
Medalists at the World Para Swimming Championships
S3-classified Paralympic swimmers
20th-century Mexican women
21st-century Mexican women